The Alphabet Versus the Goddess: The Conflict Between Word and Image is a work of historical anthropology by American surgeon Leonard Shlain, published by Viking Press in 1998. Shlain began with the insight: "when a critical mass of people within a society acquire literacy, especially alphabet literacy, left hemispheric modes of thought are reinforced at the expense of right hemispheric ones, which manifests as a decline in the status of images, women's rights, and goddess worship." He then applied this paradigm to 35 pairs of concepts and historical periods. These include, for example, Image/Word; Hunters/Gatherers; Aleph/Bet; Dionysus/Apollo; Birth/Death; Illiteracy/Celibacy, 500-1000; Faith/Hate; and Page/Screen, 1945-2000.

Criticism
Criticism has been leveled at the book from several angles. Some critics dispute the scientific basis of Shlain’s claims. Sandra Blakeslee writes in The New York Times, “The human nervous system, he says, was substantially rewired when people began reading alphabets. Never mind that there is no scientific evidence for this claim. Even Dr. Shlain admits that correlations don't prove cause and effect.” And “hemispheric lateralization is undergoing a renaissance. [Brain researchers] now know that the left and right halves of our brains interact dynamically and that specialization, which undoubtedly exists, is a matter of processing style rather than having specific mental traits reside on one side or the other.” 

Other critics focus on a perhaps inevitable consequence of Shlain's wide-ranging application of his paradigm: errors of fact. “The factual errors in the book would take more space to detail than is worth devoting to their listing. A couple of examples must suffice. Purdah (the segregation of women) is said to be a Hindu practice (159); the word is Hindi, but the practice is primarily Muslim. The Aryan invaders are said to have found Sanskrit in India (161)j Sanskrit was the language of the invading Aryans, being sister to the Iranian languages and first cousin to Greek, Latin, and English. The ranks of the Buddha's disciples are said to have excluded women (174); women are reported in Buddhist writings to have been followers of the Buddha during his lifetime.”

A third critical approach addresses the paradigm itself as overly simplistic. Kirkus Reviews calls the book, “Continually engaging, although on the whole quite woolly.” “This is one of those annoying books, in which I find some bits gripping and enlightening, and other bits simply untenuously presumptuous…"

Several reviewers have commented that the book is readable and engaging: "And yet, having put all my reservations on the table, I am still left with a good feeling about some parts of the book.” George Steiner writes in The Guardian, "Whatever Schlain's competence, there is so much in The Alphabet versus The Goddess that is slapdash and amateurish...None the less, this is a stimulating read, and the central notion that women have not been fully welcome or at home in western civilisation is, ambiguously, seductive."

See also 
 Lateralization of brain function
 List of works in critical theory
 Writing system

References 

1998 non-fiction books
American non-fiction books
Anthropology books
English-language books
Feminist books
Viking Press books